The Kalibamu, also known as the Kotanda, were an Aboriginal Australian people of the state of Queensland.

Language

Besides the oral Kalibamu language (also known as Kukatj, although it may be a separate dialect), the Kalibamu had a sign language: puffed cheeks meant lack of water; a fist on one's forehead indicated the presence of a wallaroo; stroking one's face with splayed fingers a kangaroo, and holding the arm up and bending one's hand, that an emu was nearby.

Country
Their inland extension went as far as Wernadinga, Floraville, and Punchbowl.

Social organisation

People
The last survivor of the remnant of the Kalibamu died by 1963. They made damper from grass seeds called jaboola. The eating of emu meat was restricted to the aged.

Alternative names
 Kotanda. (also occasionally used of the Kareldi).

Some words
 ngoora. (tame dog)
 goombeno (wild dog)
 yabboo (father)
 younga (mother)
 mikkaloo (white man)

Notes

Citations

Sources

Aboriginal peoples of Queensland